This is a list of hospitals in Delaware, a United States state.  According to the American Hospital Directory, there were 17 hospitals in Delaware in 2020.

Hospitals
Bayhealth Medical Center 
Bayhealth Emergency Center, Smyrna - Smyrna (Kent and New Castle Counties)
Bayhealth Hospital, Kent Campus - Dover (Kent County)
Bayhealth Hospital, Sussex Campus - Milford (Kent and Sussex Counties)
Beebe Healthcare 
Beebe Medical Center - Lewes (Sussex County)
South Coastal Health Campus Emergency Department - Millville (Sussex County)
Trinity Health
Saint Francis Healthcare - Wilmington (New Castle County)
ChristianaCare - formerly Medical Centers of Delaware (MCD)
Christiana Hospital - Newark  (New Castle County)
Middletown Emergency Department - Middletown (New Castle County)
Wilmington Hospital - Wilmington (New Castle County)
TidalHealth Services
TidalHealth Nanticoke - Seaford (Sussex County)
Nemours Foundation
Nemours Children's Hospital, Delaware - Wilmington (New Castle County)
State of Delaware
Delaware Hospital for the Chronically Ill - Smyrna (Kent and New Castle Counties)
Delaware Psychiatric Center - Wilmington (New Castle County)
Veterans Administration
Wilmington VA Medical Center - Elsmere (New Castle County)

Historic hospitals
City Hospital - Wilmington
Established in 1871
Located on Franklin Street, between Seventh and Eighth Streets
Delaware Hospital - Wilmington
Provided facility for MCD nursing school
Most services moved when MCD opened Christiana Hospital
All remaining MCD facilities in the city relocated to building and renamed Wilmington Hospital
Fort Delaware Hospital - Near Delaware City
Served as medical facility for Confederate POWs and Union troops
Closed at end of Civil War
Now part of Fort Delaware State Park
There was a hospital at Ft. Dupont, near Delaware City.  The building still exists but has been closed up and unused for many years.  More information needed.
Heald's Hygeian Home for the Treatment of Patients
Established in 1871
Located at Shallcross Avenue and Van Buren Street
Closed in 1886, a year later the building became the new Homeopathic Hospital, later renamed Wilmington Memorial
Riverside Hospital - Wilmington
Osteopathic hospital for Delaware
MCD purchased hospital when financial difficulties were encountered
Facility now run by Christiana Care as a rehab and outpatient facility
Tilton Hospital - Wilmington
Named after Dr. James Tilton, Surgeon General of the United States Army during the War of 1812
Built in 1863 for Delaware soldiers in the American Civil War
Occupied block bounded by Ninth, Tenth, Tatnall, and West Streets
Closed in fall 1865 
Wilmington General Hospital - Wilmington
Former Maternity Hospital for Northern Delaware
After NAACP injunction lifted, MCD closed facility when opening Christiana Hospital
Facility demolished and replaced by Towne Estates Condos in Bayard Square neighborhood
Wilmington Memorial Hospital - Wilmington
General surgical hospital for Northern Delaware
After NAACP injunction lifted, MCD closed facility when opening Christiana Hospital
Facility demolished and replaced by condo tower in Trolley Square neighborhood

References

Delaware
 
Hospitals